Grenchen Airport  is an airport serving Grenchen, a municipality in the district of Lebern in the canton of Solothurn in Switzerland.

Facilities

See also
 Transport in Switzerland

References

Notes

External links
 
 

Airports in Switzerland
Buildings and structures in the canton of Solothurn
Grenchen